Mushroom Jazz is a series of musical compilations by DJ Mark Farina. Originating in 1992 these were released on cassette tape, then since 1996 have been commercial CD and vinyl releases. Farina combines elements of downtempo, hip hop, jazz and R&B, French, Latin, beatmatching and mixing songs together. As with Farina's house mixes, the Mushroom Jazz series incorporates transitional effects (such as a high-pass filter) and a generally dry reverb tone.

Originally launched as a cassette series, the Mushroom Jazz tapes grew from the first Chicago run of 50 copies each on to the next stage, where 500 copies of several volumes were easily distributed and sought after.

As the acid jazz boom began, he perfected his sound and fused the newest tracks from the West Coast's jazzy, organic producers with the more urban sounds he had championed in Chicago. While the predominant musical force in San Francisco was still dark, dubby House and Wicked-style Breaks, the city embraced the downtempo movement with a healthy bunch of live bands and DJs generating the tunes.

Mark Farina, along with Patty Ryan-Smith, created the now legendary weekly Mushroom Jazz club night in San Francisco in 1992. Every Monday night the crowd slowly germinated from 100 for the first few months to 600-700 two years later. As time passed, Farina and Patty put their energies into another project, the first Mushroom Jazz interactive CD-ROM for Om Records. After a three-year run, where the club had established a fanatical, cult-like following for Farina and the Mushroom Jazz sound, the club closed its doors and transformed into a CD series and accompanying tours.

The eight commercial albums contain an array of artists including Chali 2na, Miguel Migs, People Under The Stairs, Colossus, and Pete Rock, as well as several original tracks by Farina.

Mushroom Jazz 8, the latest volume in the series, was released July 22, 2016.

Volume 1 (1996)

"Bosha Nova" – Mr. Electric Triangle
"Remember Me" – Blue Boy
"Get This" – Groove Nation
"Pick Me Up" – Deadbeats feat. Isi Samuel
"Gibby Music" – Apollo Grooves
"Midnight Calling" – Naked Funk feat. Valerie Etienne
"Midnight Calling" (Fly Amanita Remix) – Mark Farina
"If We Lose Our Way" – Paul Johnson
"In Hale" – Hydroponic Groove Sessions
"Warm Chill" – Julius Papp
"Music Use It" – Lalomie Washburn
"Longevity" – J-Live

Volume 2 (1998)

"Then Came You" – Euphonic feat. Kevin Yost
"Sandworms" – Andy Caldwell vs. Darkhorse
"Piano Grand" – Tony D
"That Time of Day (Again)" – Jaywalkers
"Poppy's Song" – Big Muff
"Made in the Shade" – Deadbeats
"Cutee" – Spacehopper
"Make ME Happy" (DJ Spinna original mix) – Cooly's Hot Box
"If I Fall" (Jay's Urban dub) – Naked Music NYC
"How Sweet It Is" – Mr Scruff feat. Mark Rae
"Liquid" (instrumental) – L-Fudge
"Sunday Night" – DJ Migs
"Lyrics and Vibes" – Smoke No Bones
"Un Pépé Dans La Dentelle" – Pépé Bradock
Hidden track

Volume 3 (2001)

"California Suite" (Vagabond mix) – King Kooba
"De La Bass" (Mousse T's Def mix) (instrumental) – Raw Instinct
"Vibrate" – The Basement Khemist
"De La Bass" (Mousse T's Def mix) (vocal) – Raw Instinct
"Relax Your Mind" – DJ Presto
"Taste of Funk" – Mateo & Matos
"Dedicated" – Dynamic Syncopation
"Do It" – Daddy's Favourite
"Flirtation" – Herb Alpert
"Collage" – Urban Backcountry
"Jazz Cop" (Mix: LP Version) – Gripper
"Schooled in the Trade" – People Under The Stairs
"Seven Steps Behind" – Polyrhythm Addicts
"Trackrunners" – Unspoken Heard
"Do It" (instrumental) – Mountain Brothers
"Rock Box" (instrumental) – Que D
"Sneakin'" – Jaffa
"Streamline" – Slide 5
"Philadelphia" – Bahamadia

Volume 4 (2002)

"A Little Soul" (Petestrumental) – Pete Rock
"Hot Bananas" – Scienz of Life
"Suite for Beaver, Pt. 1" – People Under The Stairs
"Truth In Position" – Maspyke
"Chicago Babe" – Trankilou
"Wiggle and Giggle" – Joshua
"Shoplif" (instrumental) – Ripshop feat. Mr Lif
"Keep You Head Up" – Laurne'a
"Original Beats" – DJ Slave
"No" – Fat Jon
"Mellow Soul Fruit" – Wick Wack
"Listen" – Benny Blanko
"Phone Tap" – Bernal Boogie
"Irreconcilable" – Sub-Conscious
"Seems to Know" – Julius Papp & Dave Warrin
"Find Yourself" – Spacehopper
"Seven Days" – Tek 9
"Big Fish" – Dubble D
"Bath Music" – Greyboy

Volume 5 (2005)

"Afros in Ya" – J Boogie's Dubtronic Science
"The Tribute" – Colossus
"Autumn's Evening Breeze" – The Sound Providers
"Comin' Thru" – DJ Nu-Mark feat. Chali 2na
"Come Down" – Red Astaire
"Flow" (Fluid instrumental mix) – Zion I
"Nostalgia" – DJ Spinna
"Cali Spaces" (original mix) – Mark Farina
"Funky For You" – Blu Bizness
"Puttin' In Work" (instrumental) – Wee Bee Foolish
"Hollywood" – DJ Dez
"Music Makes The World Go Round" – Jazz Liberatorz
"Maintain" (instrumental) – Strange Fruit Project
"Back In '92" (instrumental) – DJ Presto feat. Lowd
"You Like My Style" – Shortie No Mass
"Here's The Proof" – The Earl
"Modern Women's Short Stories" – Jonny Alpha
"The Kick Clap" (instrumental) – Starving Artists Crew
"It's A Love Thing" (instrumental) – Pete Rock
"The Yacht Club" – Thes One
"Nic's Groove" – The Foreign Exchange

Volume 6 (2008)

"This Beat" – The Jazzual Suspects
"Fool's Competition" – Smooth Current
"Baaaby" – Ta'Raach
"Groovin'" – Kero One
"Jamal 141" – Jamal
"Dopebeatz" – Colossus
"Calm Down" (instrumental) – Brawdcast
"Alive" (instrumental) – J Boogie's Dubtronic Science feat. Crown City Rockers
"Scene #2 (instrumental)" – Gagle
"Just Checkin'" (J's Stripped Down instrumental) – Uneaq
"The What" – Colossus
"Bodysnatchin' (On The Isle)" (instrumental) – Rubberoom
"Wasn't Really Worth My Time" – Flash
"Life" – Mark Farina
"Ba Dada" – The Jazzual Suspects
"Untitled 005" – Super Smoky Soul
"Way Back When" – Choice37
"Transit" – Colossus
"Day At The Beach" – J Boogie's Dubtronic Science
"Reflections" – Dave Allison

Volume 7 (2010)

"Down The Road" – Lurob
"Macheeto" – Slakah the Beatchild
"Colorblind" – Nathan G
"Southern Plumperz'" – Andy Caldwell feat. Rico de Largo
"More" – Joshua Heath
"It's The Beat" – Tommy Largo
"Bad Back" – King Kooba
"Introduce (SLAP Mix)" – Colossus
"Just Move" – Uneaq
"(Never Been To) California" – Jazz Spastiks
"Live Forever" – Mark Oakland
"Night Time" – Tommy Largo
"Please Be Mine" – Derek Dunbar
"Walking The Dog" – Giano & Michael Knight
"Amber Leaf" – Jazz Spastiks
"Stressin'" – The Hue (Tim K and JT Donaldson) feat. Kissey Asplund
"Living For The Rush" – Slakah the Beatchild
"All Night" – Billa Qause
"Brooklyn's Groove" – Dave Allison

Volume 8 (2016) 

 "Intro"
 "Crawfish & Chips" – QSTN
 "Best Believe" – Emapea
 "Duke" – DJ Spinna
 "Rain Drops" – Freddie Joachim
 "Hear It From You" – Freddie Joachim feat. Lauren Santiago 
 "Strictly Business" The Slipmat Brothers
 "You Dig?" – Jenova 7
 "Chalkboard" – Jazzual Suspects 
 "Ride" – Freddie Joachim 
 "Night Light" – PH-Wert
 "Focus Point" – Fredfades & Eikrem
 "Lil Boy" – Riccio 
 "Orange" – Emapea 
 "Bright Lights" – George Kelly feat. Andre Espeut & BnC (Instrumental) 
 "Economy Of Movement" – The Slipmat Brothers 
 "Body Boogie" – Sunner Soul 
 "Real Fungi" – Colossus
 "Quiet Blues" – PH-Wert 
 "Basement Jazz" – Ed Wizard & Disco Double Dee 
 "Blue (Extended)" – The Deli 
 "Slow It Down" – Colossus 
 "I Still Don’t (Pt. II)" – Larry de Kat

References

Electronica compilation albums
Jazz compilation albums
Compilation album series